Deniz Çınar (born 8 December 1984, in Izmir, Turkey) is a Turkish yacht racer competing in the 470 class. His brother Ateş is also a national sailor. He studied at Dokuz Eylül University.

He began with sailing at the age of ten in Foça, and one year later he started to race.

He became gold medalist in the Optimist class at the 1999 Balkan & Open Sailing Championship in Romania. In 2001 he won the Turkish Sailing Foundation Trophy in the Laser 4.7 class. He gained the silver medal at the Laser 4.7 World Championships held off Çeşme, Turkey. In 2007, he became Turkish champion in the Laser 4.7 class.

Deniz Çınar represented his country in the 470 class event at the 2008 Summer Olympics along with his brother Ateş Çınar. Both qualified again for participation at the 2012 Summer Olympics, where Deniz will be the skipper.

Achievements

References

External links
 
 
 

1984 births
Living people
Turkish male sailors (sport)
Olympic sailors of Turkey
Sailors at the 2008 Summer Olympics – 470
Sailors at the 2012 Summer Olympics – 470
Sailors at the 2016 Summer Olympics – 470
Sailors at the 2020 Summer Olympics – 470
Dokuz Eylül University alumni
Sportspeople from İzmir